Marcus Chang (Pha̍k-fa-sṳ: Chong Li̍p-ngong; born 28 May 1983) is a Taiwanese actor and singer-songwriter. He made his acting debut with the 2014 film Café. Waiting. Love. He is best known for his leading roles in the television series Back to 1989 (2016), Behind Your Smile (2016-2017), Between (2018), and Lost Romance (2020).

Life and career 
Chang was born in Taipei, Taiwan on May 28, 1983. He has one younger brother. At the age of 13, Chang moved to New Zealand with his family. He attended St. Peter's College for his secondary school. Chang graduated from the University of Auckland, majoring in Performing Arts and Audio Engineering.

Following his graduation in 2006, Chang moved back to Taiwan to pursue a career as a singer. In 2007, he entered One Million Star, a Taiwanese televised singing competition. He appeared in advertisements for CPC Corporation and Asia-Pacific Interactive Service in 2012.

Chang made his official debut with Giddens Ko’s 2014 film, Café. Waiting. Love, alongside Vivian Sung. In 2015, he was cast in the television series To the Dearest Intruder.

In 2016, Chang took on his first leading role in the television series Back to 1989 and won the Best Potential Award at the Sanlih Drama Awards. In 2016-2017, he starred in the television series Behind Your Smile.

In 2018, Chang starred in the television series Between. His debut extended play,  Zero (±1), was released on August 31, 2018 under Sony Music Taiwan.  The title of the EP represents his dual identities: actor and musician.

In 2019, Chang held his first solo concert at Legacy Taipei. He made cameo appearances in the movie Nina Wu and television series Let’s Go Crazy on LIVE! Chang’s second EP, Oxymoron, was released on December 26, 2019.

Chang’s second solo concert, Voice Up, was originally scheduled for April 25, 2020 at Legacy Taipei but was postponed to August 26th due to the COVID-19 pandemic.

In 2020, Chang reunited with Vivian Sung in the idol drama Lost Romance, in which he played dual roles as an overbearing CEO in a fictional universe inside a romance novel and in the real world. He also wrote and performed the Lost Romance soundtrack, “Lose to You.” Lost Romance placed number one in its time slot during most of its run, and Chang and Sung were praised for their on-screen chemistry.

In 2021, Chang won the Asian Star Prize at the 16th Seoul International Drama Awards for his leading role in Lost Romance.

Filmography

Television

Film

Web series

Theater

Music videos

Discography

Extended plays

Singles

Compositions
Music and lyrics written by Chang.

Awards and nominations

References

External links 

 

Living people
1983 births
21st-century Taiwanese male actors
Taiwanese songwriters
University of Auckland alumni
Male actors from Taipei
Taiwanese male film actors
Taiwanese male stage actors
Taiwanese male television actors
Writers from Taipei
21st-century Taiwanese  male singers
 People educated at St Peter's College, Auckland